Simele Sport Club, is an Iraqi football team based in Simele, Dohuk, that plays in the Iraq Division Two and Kurdistan Premier League.

Managerial history
 Marian Mihail (2012–2013)
 Hazem Salih (2013–2014)

See also
 1998–99 Iraq FA Cup
 1999–2000 Iraq FA Cup
 2001–02 Iraq FA Cup
 2002–03 Iraq FA Cup

References

External links
 Simele SC on Goalzz.com
 Iraq Clubs- Foundation Dates

1991 establishments in Iraq
Association football clubs established in 1991
Football clubs in Dohuk